LaKela Brown (born 1982) is a Brooklyn-based artist working in sculpture and plaster relief. Her work is strongly influenced by hip-hop culture and African American aesthetics.

Education 
Brown was born in Detroit, Michigan. She received a BFA in 2005 from the College for Creative Studies in Detroit.

Solo exhibitions 
Brown's first solo exhibitions took place in 2007 at Moka Gallery, Chicago, and the Alumni/Faculty Hall of the College for Creative Studies in Detroit. She has since exhibited her work at Jackie Klempay, Brooklyn, and Cave Gallery, Detroit, and her work was featured throughout Rockefeller Center during summer 2019. In 2018 she had her first international exhibition, Untitled at Lars Friedrich Gallery, Berlin, as well as Material Relief at Reyes | Finn, Detroit. She was exhibited in Surface Possessions at 56 Henry in summer 2019.

Residencies 
Brown was a faculty artist in residence at Ox-Bow School of Art in Saugatuck, Michigan in 2018. She has also been in residence at Mano y Mente in Tulsa Rosa, New Mexico, and the Art on the Move program in the Detroit area.

References

1982 births
Living people
American women sculptors
21st-century American women artists